An April Shroud is a 1975 crime novel written by Reginald Hill, it is also the fourth novel in the Dalziel and Pascoe series.

The novel is mainly about Dalziel, as Peter and Ellie Pascoe marry and go on honeymoon. Taking leave himself, Dalziel stumbles across a case of embezzlement and murder, which he solves with Pascoe's last minute assistance in the closing chapters.

Publication history
1975, London: Collins Crime Club , Pub date 7 July 1975, Hardback
2009, New York: Felony & Mayhem Press , Pub date May 2009.

1975 British novels
Novels by Reginald Hill
Collins Crime Club books